Stepan Petrovich Schipachev (7 January 1898 – 1 January 1980) was a Russian Soviet poet. He is best known for the poem Lines of Love and poetry collections Musings (1962), A Man's Hand (1964), and Selected Works (1965).

He was engaged in literary activity from 1919, after he became a member of the Communist Party. He has published more than 20 poetry collections. Many of his verses were published in the periodical press. His themes include reflection on nature and on romantic love, however he was primarily known for his lyrics on social subjects (what in Russian poetical tradition is called гражданская лирика).

Schipachev was a member of the board of the Union of Soviet Writers and head of its poets section. 

Poet Yevgeny Yevtushenko claims that in 1960 Shchipachev actively opposed the ban for Yevtushenko travelling abroad. Shchipachev signed a famous letter from a group of Soviet writers that was published in Pravda on August 31, 1973, in which they condemned writer Aleksandr Solzhenitsyn and nuclear physicist Andrei Sakharov.

He was buried at the Kuntsevo Cemetery.

The Literary Museum of Stepan Shchipachev was established in 1993, dedicated to life and works of the Soviet poet.

References

External links 
List of Stepan Shchipachev's works

1898 births
1980 deaths
Russian male poets
20th-century Russian poets
Recipients of the Order of Lenin
Stalin Prize winners
Communist Party of the Soviet Union members
Burials at Kuntsevo Cemetery

Institute of Red Professors alumni
Recipients of the Order of the Red Star
Recipients of the Order of the Red Banner of Labour
Recipients of the Order of Friendship of Peoples